Leonard Martindale (30 June 1920 – 9 October 1971) was an English-born association footballer who played as a wing half in the Football League either side of World War II.

He made 69 League appearances for Burnley, before transferring to Accrington Stanley in 1951-52.

References

1920 births
1971 deaths
Footballers from Bolton
Association football wing halves
Rossendale United F.C. players
Burnley F.C. players
Accrington Stanley F.C. (1891) players
English footballers